Rottenburg an der Laaber is a town  in the district of Landshut, in Bavaria, Germany. It is situated on the river Große Laber, 21 km northwest of Landshut.

Notable residents/natives 

 Max Ritter von Müller (1887–1918), World War I fighter ace and highest scoring Bavarian in the war
 Manfred Weber, politician

References

External links
 

Landshut (district)